
Year 355 (CCCLV) was a common year starting on Sunday (link will display the full calendar) of the Julian calendar. At the time, it was known as the Year of the Consulship of Arbitio and Maesius (or, less frequently, year 1108 Ab urbe condita). The denomination 355 for this year has been used since the early medieval period, when the Anno Domini calendar era became the prevalent method in Europe for naming years.

Events 
 By place 

 Roman Empire 
 January 1 – Arbitio and Lollianus Mavortius begin their term as Roman consuls.
 August 11 – Claudius Silvanus, accused of treason, proclaims himself Roman Emperor. After 28 days, Ursicinus arrives from Rome and has Silvanus murdered.
 November 6 – In Mediolanum (Italy), Emperor Constantius II raises his cousin Julian the Apostate to the rank of Caesar. He takes command of the western provinces and marries Constantius' sister, Helena.

 Europe 
 The Lentienses, a Germanic tribe, are fined by the Roman commander Arbetio under Constantius II for several incursions against the Roman Empire.
 The Franks besiege Colonia Agrippinensium for ten months.

 Asia 
 The Huns of Central Asia begin their great drive westwards with an advance into Scythia (modern Russia). They overcome and absorb the Alans, a nomadic and warlike horse breeding people from the steppes northeast of the Black Sea.

 By topic 

 Religion 
 Pope Liberius refuses to sign a condemnation of Athanasius, Patriarch of Alexandria, imposed at Milan by Constantius II. Liberius is exiled to Beroea (Greece) and replaced by Felix II. He becomes an antipope and bishop of Rome.

Births 
 Fan Tai, Chinese general of the Jin Dynasty (d. 428)
 Murong Bao, Chinese emperor of Later Yan (d. 398)

Deaths 
 September 7 – Claudius Silvanus, Roman usurper
 Aedesius, Roman Neoplatonist philosopher and mystic
 Fu Jian, Chinese emperor of the Former Qin (b. 317)
 Liang, Chinese empress of the Former Qin Dynasty
 Zhang Yaoling, Chinese ruler of Former Liang (b. 344)
 Zhang Zuo (or Taibo), Chinese ruler of Former Liang

References